David L. Deen (born December 20, 1944) is an American politician in the state of Vermont. He was a member of the Vermont House of Representatives, sitting as a Democrat from the Windham-4 district, having been first elected in 1990. Deen served for years as chair of the House Committee on Natural Resources, Fish and Wildlife. He was a member of the Vermont Senate from 1987 to 1988.

References

1944 births
Living people
University of Connecticut alumni
20th-century American politicians
21st-century American politicians
Democratic Party Vermont state senators
Democratic Party members of the Vermont House of Representatives